Antonio Spadaro, SJ (born 6 July 1966) is an Italian Jesuit priest, journalist and writer. He has been the editor in chief of the Jesuit-affiliated journal La Civiltà Cattolica since 2011. He is also a consultor to both the Pontifical Council for Culture and the Secretariat for Communications (previously known as the Pontifical Council for Social Communications). He is described as being very close to Pope Francis, who is also a Jesuit.

Vatican City—United States relations

In July 2017 Spadaro co-wrote, a controversial article entitled "Evangelical Fundamentalism and Catholic Integralism" in which he and Argentine Presbyterian Marcelo Figueroa made political statements attacking the supporters of United States president Donald Trump. The article was approved by the Cardinal Secretary of State Pietro Parolin and published in the Jesuit journal La Civiltà Cattolica. Sparado and Figueroa described American political life as Manichaean and said the Trump administration was responsible for promoting an "apocalyptic geopolitics", comparing American conservative Christians to ISIS. Spadaro took aim at American Catholics who supported the conservative movement and Trump in particular. Spadaro published an article in which he criticized Trump advisor Steve Bannon for his ideological ties to Calvinist theologian Rousas John Rushdoony in spite of his Catholic faith. He also singled out Church Militant for "shocking rhetoric." Spadaro said that American Catholics and Protestants both promoted an "ecumenism of conflict" over abortion, same-sex marriage, and religious education in schools that also included a "xenophobic and Islamophobic vision", transforming it into an intolerant "ecumenism of hate." The article also criticized conservatives for being uncritical of militarism, capitalism and the arms industry and for disregarding the environment.

While praised by liberal publications such as the National Catholic Reporter and Commonweal,  P.J. Smith wrote in First Things, "Indeed, the liberal atomization that Spadaro and Figueroa want to exalt is one of the central problems with modernity that Francis dissects brilliantly in Laudato si'. Francis teaches us in that encyclical that 'it cannot be emphasized enough how everything is interconnected.'" The Archbishop of Philadelphia, Charles J. Chaput, described the article as "an exercise in dumbing down" and accused Spadaro and Figueroa of being "willfully ignorant" of the battle faced by American Catholics and Evangelical Protestants. Chaput said, "It's an especially odd kind of surprise when believers are attacked by their co-religionists merely for fighting for what their Churches have always held to be true."

References

1966 births
20th-century Italian Jesuits
Journalists from Sicily
Italian male journalists
Living people
Religious leaders from Messina
Holy See–United States relations
Members of the Pontifical Council for Culture
Members of the Pontifical Council for Social Communications
Vatican City journalists
21st-century Italian Jesuits
La Civiltà Cattolica editors